Niranj Maniyanpilla Raju or Niranj is an Indian actor who appears in Malayalam films, made his debut through the film Black Butterfly,he won the kerala state film critics award for best debutant for the same. He is known for his films Bobby and Finals, in Bobby he performed the title character and lead role opposite to Miya. He played one of the lead characters in Finals opposite to Rajisha Vijayan. Niranj is the younger son of veteran malayalam film actor and producer Maniyanpilla Raju.

Personal life 
Niranj was born in 1993 to actor and producer Maniyanpilla Raju and Indira, have an elder brother Sachin. He completed Bachelor of Commerce from Mar Ivanios College, he also completed masters in international marketing management from the university of surrey in england.

Filmography

References

External links
 

21st-century Indian male actors
Living people
Male actors from Kerala
Film producers from Kochi
Male actors in Malayalam cinema
1994 births